SPOLU may refer to:

 SPOLU (Czech Republic), a Czech political alliance
 Together – Civic Democracy (Slovak: SPOLU – občianska demokracia), a Slovak political party